The Treaty of Vilnius or Vilna was a treaty signed at Vilnius on 31 August 1559 (during the Livonian War) between the Livonian Order and the Grand Duchy of Lithuania. Gotthard von Kettler, the Master of the Livonian Order, put its lands under the protection of Sigismund II Augustus, the King of Poland and Grand Duke of Lithuania. While the alliance was intended to neutralize Russia's threat to annex the Order's lands and earned military support from Grand Lithuanian Chancellor Mikołaj "the Black" Radziwiłł, Kettler was ultimately unable to prevent Russian forces from occupying most of Livonia. Thus, Kettler signed a second treaty with Poland-Lithuania on 28 November 1561, transferring the remnants of the Teutonic Order State to the Polish Crown and the Grand Duchy of Lithuania, himself becoming a vassal of Sigismund II Augustus.

References

Livonian War
1559 treaties
Vilnius (1559)
Vilnius (1559)
1559 in Europe
1550s in Poland
1559 in Lithuania
16th century in Vilnius